HD 14412 is a single star in the southern constellation of Fornax. It has the Gould designation 22 G. Fornacis, while HD 14412 is the Henry Draper Catalogue designation. The star has an apparent visual magnitude of 6.33, which, according to the Bortle scale, can be dimly seen with the naked eye from rural locations. It is drifting further away with a radial velocity of +7.5 km/s.

This star has a stellar classification of G8V, indicating that it is a main-sequence star. Based upon stellar models, it has 82% of the Sun's mass and 77% of the radius. HD 14412 is spinning with a projected rotational velocity of 3.26 km/s and is about 9.61 billion years old. It is radiating 44% of the luminosity of the Sun from its photosphere at an effective temperature of 5,482 K, giving it the yellow-hued glow of a G-type star.

HD 14412 has been examined for signs of an orbiting debris disk or a planetary companion, but as of 2012 none has been discovered.

References

External links 
 
 

G-type main-sequence stars
Solar-type stars

Fornax (constellation)
Durchmusterung objects
0095
Fornacis, 22
014412
010798
0683